John Edward Belle Shutt House and Outbuildings is a historic home and outbuilding complex located near Advance, Davie County, North Carolina.  The house was built in 1885, and is a -story, frame farmhouse with a hall and parlor plan.  It was expanded in 1905.  Also on the property are the contributing log woodshed (c. 1890), granary (c. 1900), wellhouse / smokehouse (c. 1885), garage (c. 1922), and privy (c. 1885).

It was added to the National Register of Historic Places in 1996.

References

Houses on the National Register of Historic Places in North Carolina
Houses completed in 1885
Houses in Davie County, North Carolina
National Register of Historic Places in Davie County, North Carolina